Jeong Yong-jun (born December 20, 1976), better known as Jang Hyuk, is a South Korean actor. He is best known for his leading roles in the films Volcano High (2001), Windstruck (2004), The Swordsman (2020), The Killer: A Girl Who Deserves to Die (2022), and the television dramas Successful Story of a Bright Girl (2002), Thank You (2007), The Slave Hunters (2010), Deep Rooted Tree (2011), You Are My Destiny (2014), Voice (2017), Money Flower (2017), Wok of Love (2018), My Country: The New Age (2019), Tell Me What You Saw (2020) and Bloody Heart (2022).

Career

1997–2001: Beginnings and rise to fame
Jang Yong-jun spent most of his childhood and adolescence in his birthplace, Busan, before making his acting debut in 1997 in the television drama Model under his stage name Jang hyuk. Besides the teen series School and a minor role in the little-seen film Zzang (The Best), Jang appeared in the music video of "To Mother", the 1999 debut single of popular boyband g.o.d, whom he was housemates with at that time. Also in 1999, he played the good-hearted yet aggressive Myung-ha in the series Into the Sunlight. Using the stage name "TJ", he had a brief career as a rapper and acted in several music videos from his rap album TJ Project, which was released in 2000.

Jang's career first began to take off in 2001, when he was cast in the lead role of the special-effects extravaganza Volcano High with actress Shin Min-a. His acting in the eccentric role drew praise from fans and critics.

2002–2004: Mainstream popularity and controversy
In 2002 he continued to make a name for himself, starring in the sleeper hit Jungle Juice, which made the top of the weekly box-office. His popularity continued to increase when he starred in the hugely popular TV drama Successful Story of a Bright Girl with actress Jang Na-ra. He also took a role in Public Toilet, the HK-Korea co-production by acclaimed Hong Kong director Fruit Chan which won a Special Mention in the Upstream section of the 2002 Venice Film Festival.

Jang continued to appear in high-profile projects; in 2003, Jang starred alongside Lee Na-young in the comedy Please Teach Me English, by director Kim Sung-su and the following year, he starred opposite Jun Ji-hyun in Kwak Jae-yong's Windstruck. Although Windstruck was generally not well received in Korea, it went on to beat Shiri and become one of the best-selling Korean films in Japan.

In late 2004, together with fellow actors Song Seung-heon and Han Jae-suk, Jang was found to have illegally avoided his mandatory military service through his and Han's agency SidusHQ. Amid widespread public condemnation, Jang apologized to his fans, then began to serve his two-year  military term.

2006–2009: Career revival and international collaborations
After his discharge from the military in 2006, Jang made his comeback in the drama series Thank You. A heartwarming story about a young single mother (played by Gong Hyo-jin) with an HIV-positive daughter and the cynical doctor who enters their lives, Thank You surprisingly became a modest hit, and with it Jang left the stigma of his draft-dodging scandal behind him.

He then signed up for the international movie production Dance of the Dragon (2008), a love story that mixed ballroom dancing with martial arts action and costarred Singaporean actress Fann Wong. He won the Best Actor award at the inaugural West Hollywood International Film Festival for his role. Jang also made a cameo in Japanese drama Ryokiteki na Kanojo, a remake of the 2001 Korean film My Sassy Girl. After his earlier guesting on star Tsuyoshi Kusanagi's talk show, the director of the drama reportedly added new scenes for Jang that were not included in the original script. Jang then appeared as the love interest in three music videos of Taiwanese singer Elva Hsiao.

More leading roles in TV dramas followed, including Robber (2008) and Tazza (2008) adapted from the gambling manhwa. In 2009, he appeared in the short film His Concern in the omnibus Five Senses of Eros, the risque thriller Searching for the Elephant, and the melodrama Maybe.

2010–2013: Critical acclaim and continued success
In 2010, he received the best reviews of his career for his leading role as the slave hunter ("chuno") Dae-gil in the hit fusion period drama The Slave Hunters. His acting coach of 14 years described Jang as being relentless in his analysis of a character. According to Jang, "It is easy to fail if you don't understand the steps one has to take to be famous." He won several acting awards, most significantly the Grand Prize ("Daesang") at the KBS Drama Awards, and a Best Actor nomination at the 2011 International Emmy Awards.

In the same year, he starred in Fall in Love with Anchor Beauty, the Chinese remake of 2000 Korean drama All About Eve. Fall in Love with Anchor Beauty received high ratings in China during its run.

Back in Korea, Jang played a fund manager-turned-lawyer in 2011's Midas, also starring Lee Min-jung and Kim Hee-ae. He next starred in legal thriller The Client (2011) with Ha Jung-woo and Park Hee-soon, saying the film satisfied his wish to portray a more emotionally complex persona. Playing a man accused of murdering his wife, Jang said he had to find "the right balance" "as someone who can appear at times like a criminal or at other times like an innocent man."

Initially reluctant to sign on to period drama Deep Rooted Tree (2011) because he found the role of low-level royal guard Kang Chae-yoon uninteresting in the original novel, Jang changed his mind upon reading that the character had been dramatized and made richer in the TV script. It tells the story of Kang investigating a case involving the serial murders of Jiphyeonjeon scholars in Gyeongbok Palace while King Sejong (played by Han Suk-kyu) is developing the Korean alphabet.

In 2013, he headlined Iris II, the sequel to the 2009 spy action series. This was his third acting collaboration with actress Lee Da-hae, after Robber and The Slave Hunters. He also returned to the big screen in 2013 blockbuster disaster film The Flu, in which he and Soo Ae played a firefighter and a doctor racing against time to find the cure for a deadly strain of the cold virus.

To the surprise of many given his past draft-dodging scandal, he then joined Real Men, a weekly show in which six male celebrities are filmed documentary-style as they enter army boot camp. This was Jang's first regular appearance on a variety/reality show in his 17-year acting career. He said, "I'd like to use this opportunity to reflect on myself through Real Men and to experience army life again." He appeared on Real Men from June 2013 to February 2014. He then wrote a collection of essays on his life experiences titled Jang Hyuk, Hot-Blooded Man, published on August 6, 2013.

2014–present
In 2014, he reunited with Volcano High director Kim Tae-kyun in Innocent Thing, a thriller about a high school girl who becomes obsessed with her married gym teacher. He also teamed up again with Successful Story of a Bright Girl costar Jang Na-ra in You Are My Destiny, a Korean remake of the similarly titled 2008 Taiwanese drama. Shortly after, he and Jang starred together for the third time in Old Farewell, about a boxer who travels into the past and re-encounters his recently deceased wife. It was part of the single-episode anthology Drama Festival, and helmed by one of their directors on Fated.

In 2015, Jang returned to the milieu of period dramas with Shine or Go Crazy, a fictional romance between a cursed Goryeo prince and the last princess of Balhae. The film Empire of Lust followed, in which he played the wily and ambitious Yi Bang-won who launched a coup to become the king of Joseon. He was next cast in the Chinese film Inside or Outside, a detective mystery co-starring Simon Yam and Wallace Huo. Jang then played a Joseon innkeeper merchant in The Merchant: Gaekju 2015.

In 2016, Jang was cast in the Chinese drama New Sea. Back in Korea, Jang starred in KBS's medical drama Beautiful Mind, playing a genius neurosurgeon. Though the drama was critically praised, the number of episodes were brought down from 16 to 14 because of low viewer ratings.

In 2017, he starred in his first cable drama, crime thriller Voice by OCN, where he played an ex-detective who joined a call center's team to track his wife's killer. Voice became a hit and its ratings broke OCN's dramas records when it was aired in Korea. His movie Ordinary Person opposite Son Hyun-joo was released in March 2017, where he acted as a manipulative National Planning Security chief. He also starred in weekend drama Money Flower, earning much acclaim and a Baeksang Arts Awards Best Actor nomination for his role as a revenge-seeking lawyer. The same year, he was cast in action film The Swordsman.

In 2018, Jang returned to the small screen with SBS' romantic comedy drama Wok of Love, playing a former gangster turned restaurant owner; and MBC's action melodrama Bad Papa, playing a former champion boxer who chose to become a bad man in order to become a good father.

In 2019, he took part in reality TV program Urban Cops where celebrities team up with real life cops to solve crimes in the city. The same year, he was cast in the historical drama My Country, playing the role of Yi Bang-won.

In 2020, Jang acted as a genius profiler in OCN drama Tell Me What You Saw. His movie The Swordsman was released in September 2020. The same year, he took part in reality TV program Yacht Expedition: The Beginning.

In 2021, Jang took part in outdoor survival variety TV program Law of the Jungle-Pioneers and cooking show National Bang Bang Cook Cook. His noir movie Tomb of the River was released in November 2021.

In 2022, Jang returned to the small screen with KBS2's historical drama Bloody Heart, playing the first vice-premier and a living symbol of power and a figure that everyone obeys. His movie The Killer: A Girl Who Deserves to Die made its world premiere at the Udine Far East Film Festival in April 2022, held a red carpet premiere at Los Angeles in June 2022 and hit the big screens simultaneously in South Korea and North America on 13 July 2022. He also won the Daniel A. Craft award for Excellence in Action Cinema at the  21st New York Asian Film Festival. In November 2022, he took part as a judge in tvN's variety program Super Action.

In March 2023, Jang decided not to renew his contract with Sidus HQ after working with the agency for 26 years since his debut.

Personal life 
Jang began dating his girlfriend, Kim Yeo-jin, in 2002. They met at a fitness club, where Kim was his Pilates instructor. The couple's marriage was registered in January 2008, and the ceremony was held in June. His close friends, singer Kim Jong-kook and actor Cha Tae-hyun, participated in the wedding ceremony. The couple have two sons and a daughter, born in February 2008, November 2009 and April 2015 respectively.

Jang has practiced Jeet Kune Do for more than 10 years and is a former professional Taekwondo athlete.

Filmography

Film

Television series

Web series

Variety show

Music video

Discography

Book

Awards and nominations

References

External links 
 
 Jang Hyuk at SidusHQ
 
 

1976 births
Living people
21st-century South Korean male actors
South Korean male film actors
South Korean male television actors
Male actors from Busan
Seoul Institute of the Arts alumni
Dankook University alumni
South Korean Jeet Kune Do practitioners
South Korean male taekwondo practitioners
South Korean male rappers
IHQ (company) artists
Draft evaders